Boris Viktorovich Tolkachyov (born 1 August 1966) is a former Russian football player.

References

1966 births
Living people
Soviet footballers
Russian footballers
Association football defenders
Russian expatriate footballers
Expatriate footballers in Ukraine
Expatriate footballers in Belarus
Russian Premier League players
FC Kuban Krasnodar players
FC Nyva Vinnytsia players
FC Khimik-Arsenal players
FC Avangard Kursk players